Parliamentary elections are due to be held in Rwanda in September 2023.

Electoral system
The 80-seat Chamber of Deputies is elected by two methods: 53 seats are directly elected by closed list proportional representation in a single nationwide constituency with an electoral threshold of 5%; seats are allocated using the largest remainder method. The remaining 27 seats are indirectly elected by local and national councils, including 24 reserved for women (six from Eastern, Southern, and Western provinces, 4 from Northern Province and 2 from Kigali), two for representatives of youth and one for representatives of handicapped.

References

2023
2023 elections in Africa
2023 in Rwanda